Cinnamodendron sampaioanum is a species of flowering plant in the family Canellaceae. It is found in the state of Rio de Janeiro in Brazil.

References 
	

sampaioanum